Lalla Miranda (1874–1944) was an Australian coloratura soprano who was primarily active in Belgium, France, and Great Britain. Born in Melbourne, she was the daughter of opera singers David Miranda and Annetta Hirst and the older sister of opera singer Beatrice Miranda. After studies in London and Paris, she made her professional opera debut in The Hague in 1898. She then appeared in numerous operas in Amsterdam in successive years. In 1899 she was a resident artist at La Monnaie. She made several appearances at the Palais Garnier in Paris and at theatres in the French Provences during the first two decades of the 20th century. In 1900–1901 and from 1907–1911 she was committed the Royal Opera House on London. In 1910 she was committed to both the Manhattan Opera Company and the Philadelphia Opera Company. She notably opened the 1910 season at the Manhattan Opera House in the title role of Donizetti's Lucia di Lammermoor, a role for which she was famous. In New York and Philadelphia she also sang Gilda in Rigoletto, Olympia in The Tales of Hoffmann, and the title role in Lakmé. After 1918 she was primarily active with the Carl Rosa Opera Company. She retired in the early 1920s. She made only a few recordings on the Pathé Records label.

References

1874 births
1944 deaths
Australian operatic sopranos
Musicians from Melbourne
19th-century Australian women opera singers
20th-century Australian women opera singers
Australian expatriates in France
Australian expatriates in the United Kingdom
Australian expatriates in Belgium